Papa Eftim III, secular name Selçuk Erenerol (1926 – 20 December 2002), was the third patriarch of the Autocephalous Turkish Orthodox Patriarchate. He was given the title of Turkish Orthodox Patriarch of the Autocephalous Turkish Orthodox Patriarchate, an unrecognised Orthodox Christian denomination, with strong influences from Turkish nationalist ideology.

Papa Eftim III was known as Selçuk Erenerol. He was the younger son of Papa Eftim I and younger brother of Papa Eftim II. He was a businessman by profession. He became patriarch after Papa Eftim II died in May 1991. Eftim III took over office ruling from 1991 until his resignation in 2002, after political disagreements with the Turkish government over growing links between the Turkish state and the Greek Ecumenical Patriarch and Turkish attempts to join the European Union. He was succeeded by his son Paşa Ümit Erenerol named as Papa Eftim IV.

Papa Eftim III died on 20 December 2002 just weeks after his resignation from his position.

References

1926 births
2002 deaths
Turkish nationalists
Turkish people of Greek descent
Autocephalous Turkish Orthodox Patriarchate